Live and Sleazy is the first live album and fifth studio album by the Village People and features a mixture of live and studio recordings. It was released as a double LP. The album featured numerous lead singers: original cop Victor Willis on the entire "Live" disk; on the "Sleazy" disk, construction worker David Hodo on track 1, Ray Simpson (who replaced Willis as the cop) on tracks 2, 3, and 5, and G.I. Alex Briley on track 4. Horace Ott is credited as the arranger and conductor of the string and horn sections. The musicians were credited as Bittersweet.

Victor Willis had announced plans for the live portion of this album be remastered and reissued as a stand alone live album titled “Village People Live At The Greek Theatre” in 2018. Other songs left off the original release though performed on the 1979 tour include "Key West", "Go West", "Village People", and "I Wanna Shake Your Hand".

Cash Box called the song "Sleazy" "an amusing self-parody which, vocally, relies more than ever on the group's zealous choral work." Record World called it "great dance music."

Track listing
All music composed by Jacques Morali

Live

Sleazy
All songs written by J. Morali, H. Belolo, B. Whitehead, P. Hurtt

Note: The Rebound Records CD release placed the studio tracks before the live tracks.

Personnel
Credits adapted from Discogs.

Village People
 Victor Willis – lead vocal on "Live"  (album)
 Ray Simpson – lead vocals on "Sleazy" (album)
 David "Scar" Hodo – backing vocals, lead vocals on "Sleazy" (song)
 Alex Briley – backing vocals, lead vocals on "Save Me (Ballad)"
 Randy Jones – backing vocals
 Felipe Rose – backing vocals
 Glenn M. Hughes – backing vocals

Production
 Jacques Morali – producer
 Henri Belolo – executive producer
 Horace Ott – string and horn arrangements, conductor
 Michael Hutchinson – mixing on "Sleazy" side
 Joe Barbaria – engineer
 Michael Hutchinson – engineer
 Steve Mitchell – engineer
 Carla Bandini – assistant engineer
 Chris Fergesen – assistant engineer
 Derek Du Nann – assistant engineer
 Doug Grinbergs – assistant engineer
 Jon Smith – assistant engineer
 Matthew Weiner – assistant engineer
 Stephen Lumel – art direction
 Lynn Goldsmith – photography

Bittersweet
 Albert Finney - Guitar
 Keith Starkey - Bass
 Greg Baker - Drums
 Chuck Kentis -Synthesizer
 Zack Stephens - Synthesizer
 Lawrence Killian - Percussion

Additional Percussion and background vocals
 L.Waymer - Percussion
 C. St. Charles - Percussion
 Ray Simpson - Percussion
 Milt Grayson - Percussion
 Peter Whitehead - Percussion
 D. Andres - Percussion

Charts

Weekly charts

Certifications and sales

References

1979 albums
Albums arranged by Horace Ott
Albums produced by Jacques Morali
Casablanca Records albums
Village People albums